Phoenicia was an ancient civilization in the north of Canaan in parts of Lebanon, Syria, and Palestine.

Phoenicia may also refer to:

Historical places
Phoenice (Roman province), a province of the Roman Empire encompassing the region of Phoenicia
Phoenice, a Greek city in Albania
Finike, a Turkish district historically named Phoenicus
Phoenicus (Lycia)
Foinikas, Cyprus

Modern places
Phoenicia, New York, a New York village
Phoenicia station, a train station in Phoenicia, New York
Phoenicia Hotel Beirut, a hotel in Beirut, Lebanon
Hotel Phoenicia, a hotel in Floriana, Malta

Other
Phoenicia (periodical), a Montreal-based Lebanese pan-Arab publication
 Phoenicia, official name of star HD 192263, in the constellation of Aquila

See also

Phoenician (disambiguation)
Syria Phoenicia (disambiguation)

Phoenicus (disambiguation)
Phoenix (disambiguation)